Željko Bogut (born October 8, 1969, in Mostar, SR Bosnia and Herzegovina, Yugoslavia) is a Bosnian-Herzegovinian chess player and two time national champion, only player in Bosnia and Herzegovina who won title twice, in 2006 and in 2010. This second time earned him GM norm.

Biography
Željko Bogut was born in Mostar. He learned to play chess as a five-year-old and became an active chess player in 1994, when he started playing for Hšk Zrinjski Mostar. His first major win was achieved in Herzegovina in 1987. He played for Hšk Zrinjski Mostar until 1997. During that time, he was the champion of Herzeg-Bosnia in 1995 and tied for first place in the same contest in 1996. The same year he won an international tournament in Biel and in 1997, won the Open Tournament H-B in Mostar. In 1997 he changed his club to ŠK Široki Brijeg. From 1997 on, he won the Open Tournament of Dubrovnik in 2003 and became the champion of Bosnia and Herzegovina. He won a lot of rapid tournaments while representing each of his clubs.

In team chess, he took part in three Chess Olympiads, in Calviá, Turin and Dresden, playing for Bosnia and Herzegovina. He alao took part in two European Team Chess Championships, in Crete and Novi Sad. Other than playing club chess, he has also opened a chess school. He currently has 2468 points on the ELO list which is his highest rating ever.

Private life
Bogut is married and has four children. His occupation is a lawyer and he works in the Ministry of Justice, Sarajevo.

Notable tournament and match records
1996   Biel I
2003   Dubrovnik I
2004   Calviá (Chess Olympiad)
2005   Bosnia and Herzegovina Championship, Brčko IV
2006   Turin (Chess Olympiad)
2006   Bosnia and Herzegovina Championship, Vitez I
2007   Bosnia and Herzegovina Championship, Sarajevo V-VI
2008   Dresden (Chess Olympiad)
2010   Bošnjaci I-II
2010   Bosnia and Herzegovina Championship, Široki Brijeg I

Sample game

In round 3 of 17th Croatian team Championship - 1B League in 2008, Bogut defeated 84th player on the July 2008 FIDE list Murtas Kazhgaleyev with the white pieces in a Sicilian defense.

External links
 
 
 Zeljko Bogut player profile at Chessmetrics
 
 

1969 births
Living people
Croats of Bosnia and Herzegovina
Sportspeople from Mostar
Bosnia and Herzegovina chess players
Chess International Masters